Åland is an autonomous and demilitarised region of Finland since 1920 by a decision of the League of Nations. It is the smallest region of Finland by area and population, with a size of 1,580 km2, and a population of 30,129, constituting 0.51% of its land area and 0.54% of its population. Its only official language is Swedish and the capital city is Mariehamn.

Åland is situated in an archipelago, called the Åland Islands, at the entrance to the Gulf of Bothnia in the Baltic Sea belonging to Finland. It comprises Fasta Åland on which 90% of the population resides and about 6,500 skerries and islands to its east. Of Åland's thousands of islands, about 60–80 are inhabited. In the east, the Åland archipelago is contiguous with the Finnish archipelago. Åland's only land border is located on the uninhabited skerry of Märket, which it shares with Sweden.

Åland's autonomous status means that those provincial powers normally exercised by representatives of the central Finnish government are largely exercised by its own government. The current demilitarised, neutral position of Åland dates back to the days of the Paris Peace Treaty after the Åland War in the 1850s. 2022 marked the 100th anniversary of the autonomous status.

Autonomy 

The autonomous status of Åland was affirmed by a decision made by the League of Nations in 1921 following the Åland Islands dispute. It was reaffirmed within the treaty admitting Finland to the European Union. By law, Åland is politically neutral and entirely demilitarised, and residents are exempt from conscription to the Finnish Defence Forces. Åland was granted extensive autonomy by the Parliament of Finland in the Act on the Autonomy of Åland of 1920, which was later replaced by new legislation by the same name in 1951 and 1991. The constitution of Finland defines a "constitution of Åland" by referring to this act. Åland remains exclusively Swedish-speaking by this act. 
Although a referendum to join the European Union had been held in mainland Finland on 16 October 1994, Åland held a separate vote on 20 November as they were a separate customs jurisdiction. EU membership was approved by 73.64% of voters. In connection with Finland's admission to the European Union, a protocol was signed concerning Åland that stipulates, among other things, that provisions of the European Community Treaty shall not force a change of the existing restrictions for foreigners (i.e., persons who do not enjoy "home region rights"——in Åland) to acquire and hold real property or to provide certain services.

Etymology 
Åland's original name was in the Proto-Norse language . Proto-Germanic  is related to the Latin word for water, . In Swedish, this first developed into  and eventually into , literally 'river land'—even though rivers are not a prominent feature of Åland's geography.

Another theory suggests that the Finnish  would be the original name of the archipelago, from which the Swedish  derives.

It is worth mentioning that 'avena' is Latin for 'oats'. This might have led Pliny the Elder to write of "some islands [...] the inhabitants [...] live on [...] oats"  and be an indication of their name at the time of writing: AD 77.

The official name, means 'the Region of Åland';  is cognate to English landscape.

History 

Members of the Neolithic Comb Ceramic culture started settling the archipelago some 7000 years ago, after the islands had begun to re-emerge from the sea after being pushed down by the weight of the continental ice of the latest ice-age. Two Neolithic cultures met on Åland: the Comb Ceramic culture and the later Pit-Comb Ware culture which spread from the west.

Stone Age and Bronze Age people obtained food by hunting seals and birds, fishing, and gathering plants. They also started agriculture early on. From the Iron Age, Åland has six hillforts. From the Viking age there are over 380 documented burial sites.

The coat of arms of Åland was originally to be granted to the Swedish island province of Öland in 1560; the two had been mixed up by mistake. It displays a golden red deer (which does not live in Åland) on a blue field. This is traditionally surmounted by a comital coronet of the elder Swedish style.

Along with Finland, Åland formed part of the territory ceded to Russia by Sweden under the Treaty of Fredrikshamn in September 1809. As a result, they became part of the semi-autonomous Grand Duchy of Finland (1809–1917). During negotiations, Sweden failed to secure a provision that the islands not be fortified.

In 1832, Russia started to fortify the islands, with the great fortress of Bomarsund. In 1854, as part of the campaign in the Baltic during the Crimean War against Russia, a combined British and French force of warships and marines captured and destroyed the fortress during the Åland War. The 1856 Treaty of Paris demilitarised the entire Åland archipelago.

During the Finnish Civil War, in 1918, Swedish troops intervened as a peacekeeping force between the Russian troops stationed on the islands and "White" and "Red" Finnish troops who came from Finland over the frozen sea. Within weeks, the Swedish troops gave way to German troops who occupied Åland at the request of the "White" (conservative) Senate of Finland.

After 1917, the residents of Åland worked towards having them ceded to Sweden. In 1919 96.4% of the voters in Åland signed a petition for secession from Finland and for integration with Sweden, with over 95% in favour. Swedish nationalist sentiments had strengthened particularly as a result of the anti-Swedish tendencies in Finland and as a result of Finnish nationalism fueled by Finland's struggle to retain its autonomy and resistance against Russification. The conflict between the Swedish-speaking minority and the Finnish-speaking majority on the Finnish mainland, prominent in Finnish politics since the 1840s, contributed to the apprehension of the Åland population about a future within Finland.

Finland, however, declined to cede the islands and instead offered the islanders an autonomous status. Nevertheless, the residents did not approve the offer, and in 1921 the dispute over the islands went before the newly formed League of Nations. The latter decided that Finland should retain sovereignty over the province, but that Åland should be made an autonomous territory. One of the important proponents of a diplomatic solution to the case was Nitobe Inazō, who was one of the Under-Secretaries General of the League and the director of the International Bureaux Section, in charge of the International Committee on Intellectual Cooperation. The Åland convention of 20 October 1921, signed by Sweden, Finland, Germany, the United Kingdom, France, Italy, Denmark, Poland, Estonia, and Latvia, was the first international agreement achieved by the League. Thus, Finland was obliged to ensure the residents of Åland the right to maintain the Swedish language, as well as their own culture and local traditions. The convention of 1921 established the neutral status of Åland by international treaty, prohibiting the placing of military installations or forces on the islands. Åland's Regional Assembly convened for its first plenary session in Mariehamn on 9 June 1922; today, the day is celebrated as Self-Government Day of Åland.

Because of the condition of neutrality under the 1921 Convention, the islanders enjoyed safety at sea during World War II, as their merchant fleet sailed both for the Allied countries and for Nazi Germany. Consequently, Åland shipping was not generally attacked, as the various military forces rarely knew which cargo was being carried or to whom.

The islanders' disappointment about insufficient support from Sweden in the League of Nations, Swedish disrespect for Åland's demilitarized status in the 1930s, and some feelings of a shared destiny with Finland during and after the Second World War, changed their perception of their relationship with Finland from "a Swedish province in Finnish possession" to "an autonomous part of Finland".

Finland marked the 150th anniversary of the demilitarisation of Åland by issuing a high-value commemorative coin, the €5 150th Anniversary of Demilitarisation of Åland commemorative coin, minted in 2006. The obverse depicts a pine tree, a typical feature of Åland. The reverse features a boat's stern and rudder, with a dove perched on the tiller, a symbol of 150 years of peace.

Politics 

Åland is governed according to the Act on the Autonomy of Åland and international treaties. These laws guarantee the region's autonomy from Finland, which has ultimate sovereignty over them, as well as a demilitarised status.

Åland has its own flag and has issued its own postage stamps since 1984. It runs its own police force, and is an associate member of the Nordic Council. Åland is demilitarised, and the population is exempt from conscription. Although Åland's autonomy preceded the creation of the regions of Finland, the autonomous government of Åland also has responsibility for the functions undertaken by Finland's regional councils. Åland Post provides postal services to the islands, and is a member of the Small European Postal Administration Cooperation. Åland is considered a separate entity for amateur radio purposes and have their own call sign prefix granted by Finland, OH0, OF0 and OG0 (last character is zero).

Åland is guaranteed representation in the Finnish parliament, to which they elect one representative. Åland also has a different system of political parties from the mainland.

Homeschooling, which has been effectively banned in Sweden since 2011, is allowed by the Finnish government. Due to the islands' proximity to Sweden and because they are Swedish-speaking, a number of Swedish homeschooling families have moved from the Swedish mainland to Åland, including Jonas Himmelstrand, the chairman of the Swedish association for homeschooling.

After a reform of the electoral law, Åland was to introduce internet voting in 2019 for expat voters in the parliamentary elections, considering opening the use of the same system for the next elections (2023) to all the voters. However, its use was cancelled at the last minute due to a lack of evidence of the trustability of the system.

Åland's parties include a separatist party called the Future of Åland, whose main program includes driving autonomous Åland into a completely independent state.

Åland and the EU 
Åland held its own referendum on membership of the European Union on 20 November 1994. A majority of Ålanders voted in favour of membership, and it followed Finland into the Union in 1995. A special Åland protocol regulates Åland's position within the EU. It has some important exceptions, concerning the right of non-Ålanders to own real estate and the right of non-Ålandic companies to establish themselves in the region, and concerning EU tax legislation. The last item's derogation means that Åland is considered a third country for tax purposes, which has had the most important effect of allowing the profitable sale of tax-exempt goods on ferries to and from Sweden and Finland to continue.

Administration 

The State Department of Åland represents the Finnish central government and performs many administrative duties. It has a somewhat different function from the other Regional Administrative Agencies, owing to its autonomy. Before 2010, the state administration was handled by the Åland State Provincial Office.

Åland has its own postal administration but still uses the Finnish five-digit postal code system, using the number range 22000–22999, with the prefix AX. The lowest numbered postal code is for the capital Mariehamn, AX 22100, and the highest AX 22950 for Jurmo.

Municipalities 

Åland contains 16 municipalities. Over forty percent of all inhabitants live in Mariehamn, the capital.

 Mariehamn
Population:  
 Jomala
Population:  
 Finström
Population:  
 Lemland
Population:  
 Saltvik
Population:  
 Hammarland
Population:  
 Sund
Population:  
 Eckerö
Population:  
 Föglö
Population:  
 Geta
Population:  
 Vårdö
Population:  
 Brändö
Population:  
 Lumparland
Population:  
 Kumlinge
Population:  
 Kökar
Population:  
 Sottunga
Population:  

Geography 

Åland occupies a position of strategic importance, as it commands one of the entrances to the port of Stockholm, as well as the approaches to the Gulf of Bothnia, in addition to being situated near the Gulf of Finland.

The Åland archipelago includes nearly three hundred habitable islands, of which about 60-80 are inhabited; the remainder are merely some 6,200 skerries and desolate rocks. The archipelago is connected to Åboland archipelago in the east—the archipelago adjacent to the southwest coast of Finland. Together they form the Archipelago Sea. To the West from Åland is the Sea of Åland and to the North is the Bothnian Sea.

The surface of the islands is generally rocky and the soil thin due to glacial stripping at the end of the most recent ice age. The islands also contain many meadows that are home to many different kinds of insects, such as the Glanville fritillary butterfly.

Ninety per cent of the population live on Fasta Åland, which is also the site of the capital town of Mariehamn. Fasta Åland is the largest island in the archipelago. Its area is difficult to estimate due to its irregular shape and coastline, but estimates range from 740 square kilometres to 879 square kilometres to over 1,010 square kilometres, depending on what is included or excluded. There are several harbours.

During the Åland Islands dispute, the parties sought support from different maps of the area. On the Swedish map, the most densely populated main island dominated, and many skerries were left out. On the Finnish map, many smaller islands or skerries were, for technical reasons, given a slightly exaggerated size. The Swedish map made the islands appear to be closer to the mainland of Sweden than to Finland; the Finnish map stressed the continuity of the archipelago between the main island and mainland Finland, while a greater gap appeared between the islands and the archipelago on the Swedish side. One consequence is the often repeated number of "over 6,000" skerries that was given authority by the outcome of the arbitration.

Many animals that live in the islands are not native. Animals such as elk and other species of deer were introduced in the 20th century.

Climate 
Åland has a humid continental climate (Dfb) that is influenced by its maritime position, especially in summer. While summers are cooler than on both the Swedish and Finnish mainland, winters see little difference to the adjacent parts of Sweden and are only narrowly milder than in mainland Finland.

Economy 

Åland's economy is heavily dominated by shipping, trade and tourism. Shipping represents about 40% of the economy, with several international carriers owned and operated from Åland. Most companies aside from shipping are small, with fewer than ten employees. Farming and fishing are important in combination with the food industry. A few high-profile technology companies contribute to a prosperous economy. Wind power is rapidly developing, aiming at reversing the direction in the cables to the mainland in coming years. In December 2011, wind power accounted for 31.5% of Åland's total electricity usage.

The main ports are the Western Harbour of Mariehamn (south), Berghamn (west) and Långnäs on the eastern shore of the Main Island. Fasta Åland has the only four highways in Åland: Highway 1 (from Mariehamn to Eckerö), Highway 2 (from Mariehamn to Sund), Highway 3 (from Mariehamn to Lumparland) and Highway 4 (from Finström to Geta).

Mariehamn served as the base for the last large oceanic commercial sailing-ships in the world. Their final tasks involved bringing Australian wheat to Great Britain, a trade which Åland shipowner Gustaf Erikson kept going until 1947. The ships latterly made only one round-trip from South Australia to Britain per year, (the grain race), after each marathon voyage going back to Mariehamn to lay up for a few months. The ship Pommern, now a museum in Mariehamn, was one of these last vessels.

The abolition of tax-free sales on ferry boats travelling between destinations within the European Union made Finland demand an exception for Åland on the European Union value-added tax rules. The exception allows for maintained tax-free sales on the ferries between Sweden and Finland (provided they stop at Mariehamn or Långnäs) and at the airport, but has also made Åland a different tax-zone, meaning that tariffs must be levied on goods brought to the islands. Two million people visit Åland every year - but most of them just for a few hours before the ferry returns again, or the passengers change from one ship to another.

Unemployment was 3.9% in January 2014; the employment rate was 79.8 % in 2011 and 84.2 % in 2021.

The Finnish State also collects taxes, duties and fees in Åland. In return, the Finnish Government places a sum of money at the disposal of the Åland Parliament. The sum is 0.5% of total Government income, excluding Government loans. If the sum paid to the Finnish state exceeds 0.5%, then any amount above goes back to the Parliament of Åland as "diligence money". In 2010 the amount of taxes paid by Åland Islanders comprised 0.7% of the total taxes paid in Finland.

According to Eurostat,  Åland was the 20th-wealthiest of the EU's 268 regions, and the wealthiest in Finland, with a GDP per inhabitant 47% above the EU mean.

Bank of Åland is headquartered on the island.

The euro is the sole legal tender (as with the rest of Finland), although most businesses in Åland unofficially accept the Swedish krona.

The COVID-19 pandemic caused a sharper decrease in the total volume of the economy of Åland than for the neighbouring Sweden or Finland (mainland). Since the pandemic, the economy of Åland has been on a trajectory of recovery.

Demographics

Ethnicity and language 

Most inhabitants speak Swedish (the sole official language) as their first language: 86% in 2021, while less than 5% spoke Finnish. The language of instruction in publicly financed schools is Swedish. (In the rest of Finland, bilingual municipalities provide schooling both in Finnish and in Swedish.) For information about the dialect, see Åland Swedish.

The ethnicity of the Ålanders and the correct linguistic classification of their language remain somewhat sensitive and controversial. Ålanders may be considered either ethnic Swedes or Swedish-speaking Finns, but their language is closer to the Uppländska dialect of Sweden than to Finland Swedish. (See Languages of Sweden.)

Regional citizenship or the right of domicile is a prerequisite for voting, standing as a candidate for the Legislative Assembly, or owning and holding real estate situated in unplanned areas of Åland.

17.3% of Ålanders have a foreign-background, which is the highest proportion of any region in Finland. Most of them are from Sweden, with 7% of Ålanders having a Swedish-background. There are also sizable Romanian and Latvian communities.

Education 

In 2010, there were 22 primary schools in Åland. Eight of them covered both upper and lower secondary schools, two were upper secondary schools and 12 were primary schools (grades 1–6). Of these, Ålands Lyceum is a relatively large high school; according to the 2018 statistics of the education administration, as many as 432 high school students studied there. The schools on Åland also include Ålands folkhögskola and other several primary and secondary schools. Åland University of Applied Sciences teaches about 600 students in maritime, mechanical engineering, electrical engineering, IT, finance, hotels, restaurants and health care. The maritime education of Åland are all part of Alandica Shipping Academy.

The education in Åland is similar to that of Finland and the Nordics, and the language of education on Åland is officially Swedish. Finnish language has been a compulsory subject in upper secondary school, but optional in primary school; however, 80 per cent of students have chosen it. In 2006, it was proposed to remove the compulsory Finnish language from upper secondary schools.

Religion 

The majority of the population, 70.5%, belongs to the Evangelical Lutheran Church of Finland. Åland contains Finland's oldest Christian churches, including St. Olaf's Church, Jomala, which dating from the late 13th century is likely to be the oldest in Finland. Åland's largest church is the Church of St. John in Sund, dating from shortly after.

Culture

Literature 
The most famous writers in Åland are Anni Blomqvist, known for her five-volume Stormskärs-Maja series, Sally Salminen, whose best-known work is the 1936 novel Katrina, and Ulla-Lena Lundberg, who has described her native Kökar. Each of these works are set in Åland.

Cinema and television 
A 2016 historical drama film Devil's Bride, directed by Saara Cantell, takes place in the 17th century in Åland during the witch hunts. It won the Best Foreign Language Film Award at the Toronto Female Eye Film Festival in 2017. Also, a 2013 drama film Disciple, directed by Ulrika Bengts, is set in Åland.

Sport 

In association football Åland national team competes in the biennial Island Games, which it hosted in 1991 and 2009. Åland also hosted the 1974 and 1977 Women's Nordic Football Championship. Competitions and teams are organised by the Åland Football Association which also organise the Ålands Cup for clubs.

Women's football club Åland United, founded in 2004, and men's IFK Mariehamn are Åland's leading football clubs. IFK play in the Veikkausliiga, Finland's highest football league. Both clubs play at the Wiklöf Holding Arena in Mariehamn.

Other smaller clubs include FC Åland, IF Finströms Kamraterna, IF Fram and Lemlands IF.

Åland hosted the 2017 and 2018 Paf Masters, an annual bonspiel-women's curling tournament hosted in Eckerö.

The Åland Stags is Åland's only rugby union club.

Disc golf is popular in Åland.

Heraldry 
The coat of arms of Åland features a golden red deer on a blue field. This is traditionally surmounted by a comital coronet of the elder Swedish style. The arms borne today by Åland were originally by mistake granted to the island province of Öland in 1560, displaying a golden red deer on a blue field.

Notable people 

 Anni Blomqvist, author
 Adelina Engman, football player
 Robert Helenius, boxer
 Johan Hellström, boxer
 Karl Emanuel Jansson, painter
 Peter Lindbäck, politician and governor
 Ulla-Lena Lundberg, author
 Robert Mattson, shipowner and businessman
 Pehr Henrik Nordgren, composer
 Joel Pettersson, painter and author
 Sally Salminen, author
 Annica Sjölund, football player
 Veronica Thörnroos, politician
 Frans Peter von Knorring, social reformer
 Georg August Wallin, professor, explorer and orientalist
 Atos Wirtanen, politician and journalist

See also 

 Åland Islands dispute
 Åland Islands official football team
 Åland Swedish
 Åland War
 Åland's Autonomy Day
 Battle of Åland Islands
 Coat of arms of Åland
 Flag of Åland
 Government of Åland
 Invasion of Åland
 Languages of Åland
 Paf (Ålands Penningautomatförening)
 Provincial Governors of Finland
 Public holidays in Åland
 Transport on the Åland Islands
 Bibliography of the Åland Islands
 Index of Åland-related articles
 Outline of the Åland Islands

Further reading 
 Barros, James - The Aland Islands Question: Its Settlement by the League of Nations.
 Mead, W. R. - Saltvik: Studies from an Aland Parish.
 Sederholm, J. J. - On Migmatites and Associated Pre-Cambrian Rocks of Southwestern Finland, Part III: The Aland Islands.

References

External links 

 
Government of Åland 
B7 Baltic Islands Network 
The example of Åland, autonomy as a minor protector The Åland example: autonomy protects a minority
Ålandstidningen (local newspaper)

 
Geography of Scandinavia
Finnish islands in the Baltic
Island countries
Historical provinces of Finland
Provinces of Finland (1917–97)
Provinces of Finland (1997–2009)
Regions of Finland
Members of the Nordic Council
NUTS 1 statistical regions of the European Union
NUTS 2 statistical regions of the European Union
Special territories of the European Union
States and territories established in 1920
Autonomous regions
Swedish-speaking countries and territories
Swedish-speaking population of Finland
Demilitarized zones
1920 establishments in Europe
Former disputed islands